Interstate 26 (I-26) in North Carolina runs through the western part of the state from the Tennessee border to the South Carolina border, following the Appalachian Mountains. It is part of the larger I-26, a regional Interstate that runs from Kingsport, Tennessee, to Charleston, South Carolina. I-26 is mostly four lanes through North Carolina with few exceptions. Though signed with east–west cardinal directions (because of the even number convention), in North Carolina and Tennessee, the route goes nearly north–south, with the northern direction labeled "West" and vice versa.

Within Madison County, I-26 is officially dedicated/memorialized as the Liston B. Ramsey Freeway on the section that over laps with U.S. Route 23 (US 23).

I-26's original western terminus was Interstate 40 (I-40)/Interstate 240 (I-240) in Asheville. Between 2003 and 2005, the road was extended further north into Tennessee. Along the segment from Mars Hill to Asheville, there are future I-26 signs as some parts of the road have not yet been upgraded to Interstate Highway standards.

Route description

I-26, in concurrency with US 23, enters the state at Sams Gap (elevation ) from Tennessee. In the first , designated as a scenic byway, it features mostly six travel lanes and three runaway truck ramps going eastbound. The freeway is also parallels U.S. Route 23 Alternate (US 23A), which was the original route before 2006. At exit 13, I-26 ends and Future I-26 begins; US 19 also joins from Burnsville.

At Weaverville, Future I-26 merges with US 25/US 70, coming from Marshall; however, US 25 soon disembarks in Woodfin and continues south along Merrimon Avenue. Future I-26 enters Asheville, while parallel with the French Broad River, and merges with westbound I-240/US 74A with US 19/US 23; US 70 ends its concurrency by going eastbound I-240/US 74A instead and an additional exit at the major interchange provides access to downtown Asheville via Patton Avenue. It is signed I-26 proper again without future designation after merging with I-240.

Crossing the French Broad River along Capt. Jeff Bowen Bridge (originally Smokey Park Highway Bridge before 2012), I-26/I-240 promptly exit with two lanes to the right (same for both directions) while US 19/US 23/US 74A continue along Patton Avenue (exit 3). The interchange also features warning lights for "stopped traffic ahead", a common condition during rush hour. Between Patton Avenue (exit 3) and Haywood Road (exit 2), I-26/I-240 share a hidden concurrency with U.S. Route 19 Business (US 19 Bus.)/US 23 Bus.

At the major interchange with I-40, sometimes called Malfunction Junction, I-240 ends, with new concurrency of I-26 with US 74. The interchange features left exit and entrances; while travelers along eastbound I-26/westbound I-240, access to eastbound I-40 is via North Carolina Highway 191 (NC 191, Brevard Road, exit 1). Westbound I-40/US 74 continues on to Canton and Knoxville; eastbound I-40 provides access to nearby Biltmore Estate and further on to Hickory.

Near milemarker 36, the Blue Ridge Parkway crosses over I-26 with a  clearance; access to the Blue Ridge Parkway is via NC 191 (exit 33).

In Fletcher, I-26 goes by the Asheville Regional Airport and accesses NC 280 to Brevard and Mills River (exit 40);  later, US 25 rejoins (exit 44). In Hendersonville, it connects with US 64, which connect travelers to nearby Chimney Rock, Lake Lure, and Brevard. Between milemarkers 53 and 54, I-26 crosses the Eastern Continental Divide (elevation ) at the County Road 1803 overpass (CR 1803, Crest Road). Near East Flat Rock, US 25 separates again toward Greenville, South Carolina, while I-26 goes southeasterly down along Dodging Hill and crosses over the Green River along Peter Guice Memorial Bridge, with a  clearance from the river, making it the highest bridge in North Carolina.

In Columbus, US 74 ends concurrency at exit 67, continuing east toward Shelby. At , which combines I-26 and Future I-26, I-26 crosses the state line and into South Carolina.

I-26 also make up part of Corridor B in the Appalachian Development Highway System (ADHS). ADHS provides additional funds, as authorized by the US Congress, which have enabled I-26 to benefit from the successive improvements and widening along its routing within the corridor. The white-on-blue banner "Appalachian Highway" is used to mark the ADHS corridor.

I-26 overlaps with one state scenic byway simply known as the "I-26 Scenic Byway". Located from the Tennessee state line to exit 9 (US 19/US 23A) near Mars Hill. The byway is known for its unspoiled views of the North Carolina Mountains.

History
I-26 appeared in the original Interstate Highway plans running from Charleston to Asheville. The road was first mapped as an under construction highway from US 25 near Hendersonville north to NC 280 (current NC 146). The first segment opened in 1966 beginning at NC 280 to the US 25 connector near East Flat Rock. In 1969, I-26 was extended north to I-40, and the South Carolina segment was extended to NC 108 near Columbus. In 1973, I-26 was extended from the US 25 connector to Saluda. Three years later, I-26 was connected. The segment from Saluda to NC 108 was completed. In fall 2003, when the Madison County section opened, the Buncombe County section received the designation "Future I-26" because it did not meet Interstate standards. Starting in 2021, the section north of Asheville is scheduled for upgrades.

Building through Howard Gap
One of the hardest places to build I-26 was in Howard Gap. The work was delayed by numerous landslides along Miller Mountain and Tryon Peak. Special engineering had to be done to continue work on I-26 through the area. The most important part was controlling the soil and water on the mountains and surrounding areas. This was achieved through the installation of miles of underground pipe used to drain water from the road.

Future
In 2013, the North Carolina Department of Transportation (NCDOT) reopened the idea of widening I-26 from I-40, in Asheville, to US 25, near Flat Rock. The project had been planned 10 years earlier but was stopped by legal challenges. In 2015, it qualified and became part of the 2016–2025 State Transportation Improvement Program (STIP) and will cost $396 million to build. Right-of-way acquisition begins in 2018, with construction that was originally set to begin in 2020.

The I-26 Connector is a $600–$800 million project to build the missing gap of I-26 through Asheville. Broken into three sections, they are all planned and funded in the 2016–2025 STIP. Section A, between Haywood Road and Brevard Road, will be a widening project with reconfiguration of ramps at Haywood, Amboy, and Brevard. Section B, between north of Haywood Road to US 19/US 23/US 70, is the most expensive section of the project, at $332 million. After a review of various alternative designs, both state and federal agencies choose Alternative 4B, which will convert Patton Avenue along Bowen Bridges to local traffic and reroute I-240 along I-26 further north. Section C, the I-26/I-240/I-40 interchange, will be reconfigured to include missing ramp connects and a widening of I-40 through the area. The approximately  project will begin right-of-way acquisition in 2019, with construction on all three sections in 2021.

Another project, between Broadway Avenue and the US 19/US 23A interchanges, will be upgraded to Interstate standards by replacing bridges, expanding the highway width, and adding shoulders. The project, needed so I-26 can fully be labeled along that stretch, is currently in development. The estimated cost was $99 million, with right-of-way acquisition starting in 2020 and construction in 2022. Delays included state money and worries over how neighborhoods would be affected. Contracts are to be awarded in 2023 and 2024 and construction to take three to five years. The estimated cost increased to $1.2 billion in 2023.

Exit list

See also

Biltmore Estate
French Broad River
Pisgah National Forest

References

External links

26
 North Carolina
Transportation in Madison County, North Carolina
Transportation in Buncombe County, North Carolina
Transportation in Henderson County, North Carolina
Transportation in Polk County, North Carolina